Rowland Baring may refer to:

 Rowland Baring, 2nd Earl of Cromer (1877–1953), British peer
 Rowland Baring, 3rd Earl of Cromer (1918–1991), British peer